Wexford is a town in the south-east of Ireland.

Wexford may also refer to:

Places
 County Wexford, Ireland
 Wexford, Pennsylvania
 Wexford, Toronto, a neighborhood in Toronto, Canada
 Wexford County, Michigan
 Wexford Township, Michigan
 Wexford, a neighborhood in Germantown, Maryland

Constituencies
The whole or parts of County Wexford in Ireland have been represented through several parliamentary constituencies:
 Wexford (Dáil constituency)

before 1800
Bannow (Parliament of Ireland constituency)
Clonmines (Parliament of Ireland constituency)
Enniscorthy (Parliament of Ireland constituency)
Fethard (County Wexford) (Parliament of Ireland constituency)
Gorey (Parliament of Ireland constituency)
New Ross (Parliament of Ireland constituency)
Wexford Borough (Parliament of Ireland constituency)
Wexford County (Parliament of Ireland constituency)
Taghmon (Parliament of Ireland constituency)

1801–1885
 New Ross (UK Parliament constituency)
 Wexford Borough (UK Parliament constituency)
 County Wexford (UK Parliament constituency)

1885–1922
 North Wexford (UK Parliament constituency)
 South Wexford (UK Parliament constituency)

1918–1921
 North Wexford (UK Parliament constituency)
 South Wexford (UK Parliament constituency)

1921–present
 Wexford (Dáil constituency)

Ships
, a ship that made seven voyages for the British East India Company between 1802 and 1817
 SS Wexford, a ship that sank in Lake Huron during the Great Lakes Storm of 1913
, a Hunt-class minesweeper built in 1919

Other
 Inspector Wexford, a character in crime novels by Ruth Rendell
 Wexford Capital, a private equity firm that owns Republic Airways Holdings